Paul Tazewell is an American costume designer for the theatre, dance, and opera and television. He received the 2016 Tony Award for Best Costume Design for Hamilton. In 2016, he and his design team were awarded an Emmy for their work on The Wiz Live!. He is recipient of six total Tony Award nominations for Costume Design, four Helen Hayes Awards for Outstanding Costume Design, two Lucille Lortel Awards (for On the Town and Hamilton), Henry Hewes Award and the Theater Development Fund's Irene Sharaff Award in 1997. He received Princess the Grace Statue Award bestowed by the Princess Grace Foundation to artists of excellence in various disciplines. He is also the first African American male costume designer to be nominated for the Academy Award for Best Costume Design, for his work on Steven Spielberg's 2021 film version of West Side Story.

Biography
Born in Akron, Ohio, Tazewell graduated from the North Carolina School of the Arts and NYU's Tisch School of the Arts. Tazewell was a resident artist and associate professor of costume design at Carnegie Mellon University in Pittsburgh, Pennsylvania (2003–2006).

Tazewell has designed costumes for over a dozen Broadway productions, starting with Bring in 'Da Noise, Bring in 'Da Funk in 1996 (receiving a Tony Award nomination). Over Tazewell's career, he has costumed numerous plays that are predominantly African American and Latino. Other musicals include On the Town (Revival), The Color Purple, and, in 2009, Guys and Dolls (Revival) and Memphis.  Recent Broadway work includes Dr Zhivago, Side Show, and A Streetcar Named Desire.  Plays on Broadway have included Lombardi, The Miracle Worker (Revival), Magic/Bird and the Tony Award-winning revival of A Raisin in the Sun.  His off-Broadway work as a costume designer includes Hamilton, Elaine Stritch at Liberty (2001), Boston Marriage (2002), Ruined, One Flea Spare, Flesh and Blood, and Harlem Song (Apollo Theater).

In regional theatre he has designed costumes for, among many, Arena Stage (The Women, 1999, and Polk County, 2002), The Guthrie Theatre, The Goodman Theatre, and La Jolla Playhouse.  His work for ballet companies includes the Boston Ballet, Pacific Northwest Ballet, and the Bolshoi Ballet.  Opera credits at Glimmerglass Opera, Opera Theater of St. Louis, Houston Grand Opera, Washington National Opera, ENO, and the Metropolitan Opera.

Selected work
West Side Story, 20th Century Studios (2021) (Academy Award Nomination)
Jesus Christ Superstar Live in Concert, NBC (2018) (Emmy Award Nomination)
Summer: The Donna Summer Musical (2017)
The Immortal Life of Henrietta Lacks, HBO (2017)
Escape to Margaritaville (2017)
Ain't Too Proud (2017)
The Wiz Live! (2015) (Emmy Award)
Hamilton (2015) (Lucille Lortel Award, Tony Award)
A Streetcar Named Desire (2012) (Tony Award nomination)
Memphis (2009) (Tony Award nomination)
In the Heights (2008) (Tony Award nomination)
The Color Purple (2005) (Tony Award nomination)
A Raisin in the Sun (2004) 
Caroline, or Change (2003) (Lucille Lortel Award nomination, Outstanding Costume Design)
Boston Marriage (2002) (Lucille Lortel Award nomination, Outstanding Costume Design)
Bring in 'Da Noise, Bring in 'Da Funk (1996) (Tony Award nomination)
Before It Hits Home (1992)

References

African-American people
American costume designers
Carnegie Mellon University faculty
Living people
Primetime Emmy Award winners
Tony Award winners
Tisch School of the Arts alumni
University of North Carolina School of the Arts alumni
Year of birth missing (living people)